The United States Military Academy Band, West Point, New York is the first CD, digital format album released exclusively by The United States Military Academy Concert Band and Jazz Knights big band.

Background
 The West Point Band (U.S.M.A. Band) has a consistent tradition of high level musicians coming from the best professional groups and music schools in the country to include the Juilliard School, Curtis Institute, University of North Texas, University of Indiana, Berklee College of Music, Eastman School of Music, and others. These musicians serve in the United States Army stationed at the United States Military Academy in a permanent duty "Special Bands" assignment and receive the immediate rank of NCO (Staff Sergeant with special MOS). This U.S. Army unit has a long and distinguished tradition dating back to 1778; it is the U.S. Army's oldest active band and the oldest unit at the United States Military Academy. It was officially named The West Point Band in 1817.
 
The two groups recorded on the CD are entirely separate as concertizing units and having no crossover of musicians from ensemble to ensemble; this helps to retain a very high level of both ensembles' musicianship and expertise. They do combine into a marching band for Cadet reviews/activities and many other ceremonial military functions as per the unit's SOP.  
The Concert Band and the Jazz Knights have appeared in numerous high level military and patriotic ceremonies, public concerts, sporting events and radio and television broadcasts. They performed at the dedication of the Erie Canal, at the Chicago and New York World's Fairs, and for the funerals of Ulysses S. Grant and Franklin D. Roosevelt as well as the inaugurations and burials for numerous presidents. Additionally, the Concert Band and Jazz Knights have collaborated with some of the finest musical ensembles in the country, including the New York Philharmonic and the Boston Pops; they have also been showcased in Carnegie Hall and featured on The Today Show, 60 Minutes, Dateline NBC as well as on documentaries on the History and Discovery Channels. 
During the time of this CD recording, the concert band and marching band were featured on the Songs of the Civil War CD (for Columbia Records) and television program; 1991/1992 telecast on PBS.   The band also played the military honors for President Richard Nixon's burial (New York stretch before flight to Yorba Linda, California). The Jazz Knights were featured on the A&E Network as part of the Boston Pops 4th of July Celebration during this time (for two years).

About the music
When he assumed command in 1990, LTC Frank G. Dubuy wanted artistic documentation on a unique CD of the entire musical unit in terms of the two concertizing ensembles. One of the elements Dubuy saw lacking with the U.S.M.A. Concert Band and Jazz Knights is the fact there was no good recording of the recent U.S.M.A. groups (early 1990s). Dubuy met with the command staff about music to be recorded and picked the best possible works reflecting the present state of the groups and history embedded into the West Point Band music library and lineage.

The Concert Band recorded the opening and third movements of the Nelhýbel Concerto for Winds and Percussion as an important tribute to, and documentation of Václav Nelhýbel's close association to the West Point Band. Nelhýbel as well as Robert Russell Bennett, Morton Gould, Darius Milhaud, Percy Grainger, Henry Brandt and several other important wind band composers have written for the West Point Band over the last 150 years. The two Sousa works contrast the famous march style of the composer (Fairest of the Fair) against his programmatic music (Beneath the Southern Cross). The set of concert band recordings is rounded out with the Haydn Concerto for Oboe (Allegro Spiritoso) and the Peter Buys work Huntingdon Municipal Band March.

The entire set of eight charts the Jazz Knights recorded for these sessions were written and arranged by the three staff writers for the ensemble: Jim Perry, Jack Cooper and Paul Murtha (with an original tune by the guitarist Rob Helsel).

Track listing

Recording sessions
 Recorded and mixed: 1991–93 U.S.M.A. Band Building, West Point, New York

Personnel

Musicians

The U.S.M.A. Concert Band
 Conductor (and commander of entire unit): LTC Frank G. Dubuy
 Flute: SFC Lynn Cunningham, SSG William Treat, SSG Julie Hill
 Oboe and English Horn: SGM Derek Brinkman, MSG Joel Evans
 Eb Clarinet: SSG Rachel Grasso
 Clarinet: SGM James McKelvey, SFC Harold Easley, SFC Terence Rice, SSG Jeffrey Geller, SSG Barry Messer, SSG John Parrette, SSG Allan Plumb, SGT Chris Jones
 Bass Clarinet: SFC David Hydock, SFC Joseph Mariany
 Bassoon: MSG Kelvin Hill, SSG Christian Eberle
 Saxophone: MSG Joseph Foris, SFC Andrew Huson, SSG Gary McCourry, SSG Daniel Teare
 Cornet/trumpet: SGM John Sartoris, MSG William Connelly, MSG Michael Doyle, SFC Richard Storey, SSG Gregory Alley, SSG Robert Smither
 French Horn: MSG William Powell, SFC Joseph DeMers, SFC Dick Maxwell, SSG Harry Ditzel, SGT LaDonna Swetnam
 Trombone: MSG Steven Satone, SSG Gerard Amoury, SSG Jeffrey Slocum, SGT Martin Tyce
 Euphonium: SFC Joan Follis, SSG Barry Morrison
 Tuba: SFC Joseph Roccaro, SSG Gerald Cates, SSG Thomas Price, SGT John Reimund
 Percussion: SGM David Smith, SFC Andrew Csisack, SFC Warren Gallic, SSG Howard Potter, SSG Robert Ward

The Jazz Knights
 Conductor: CW2 Louis Letson
 Saxes and woodwinds: SFC Bryson Borgstedt, SSG Larry Wade, SFC Jim Perry, SSG Jack Cooper, SFC Greg Stegura
 Trumpets and flugelhorns: SSG Paul duBois, SFC Robert "Woody" Dotson, SFC Don Winslow, SGM Ron Seitz
 Trombones: SSG Doug Remine, SSG Harvey Tibbs, SGT James Way, SGT Matt Ingman
 Guitar: SSG Rob Helsel
 Piano: SFC Dave Horne
 Bass: SSG Lou Pappas
 Drums: MSG Ron Harsch
 Percussion: SFC Andy Cossack
 Vocalist: SGT Jeanette Hicks

Production
 Recording engineers: SGT Mark Ferguson and SGT Bruce Cain
 Mixing engineers: SGT Mark Ferguson and SGT Bruce Cain
 Production coordinator: SFC Joseph Roccaro
 Mastering: Mark Records
 Cover photo: file

Print music from the CD
 Fairest of the Fair is published by C.L. Barnhouse Comp.
 Beneath The Southern Cross is published by C.L. Barnhouse Comp.
 Huntingdon Municipal Band March is published by C.L. Barnhouse Comp.
 Bells and Whistles is published by UNC Jazz Press
 Mr. Earl's Pleasure Palace is published by UNC Jazz Press

See also
West Point Band
The Jazz Knights
U.S. Army Special Bands 
United States Military Academy

References

External links
 
 
 The United States Military Academy Band, West Point, New York, OFFICIAL WEBSITE
 United States Army Bands, U.S.M.A. Band
 West Point Band, XII° Congrès Mondial du Saxophone, qui se tiendra du 5 au 9 Juillet 2000, Montréal, Québec, Canada.
 The Jazz Knights Podcast Trailer

1993 albums
Military music
Jazz albums by American artists
Big band albums
United States Military Academy